Hobby Games: The 100 Best is a book about hobby games edited by James Lowder and published by Green Ronin Publishing.

Publication history
Shannon Appelcline stated that Green Ronin went "through a non-d20 expansion in this time period: James Lowder's '100 Best' series. There have been two entries so far: Hobby Games: The 100 Best (2007) and Family Games: The 100 Best (2010). Each included a hundred essays from industry notables describing the games that they liked best. The books have gotten some nice attention outside of the industry and are even being used as textbooks at the DigiPen Institute of Technology in Redmond, Washington."

Reception
Hobby Games: The 100 Best won the 2007 Origins Award for Non-Fiction Publication of the Year.

Hobby Games: The 100 Best won the 2008 Silver ENnie Awards for Best Regalia.

Reviews
Pyramid

References

Books about games
ENnies winners
Origins Award winners